834 Burnhamia (prov. designation:  or ) is a large background asteroid, approximately  in diameter, that is located in the outer region of the asteroid belt. It was discovered on 20 September 1916, by German astronomer Max Wolf at the Heidelberg Observatory in southwest Germany. The X-type asteroid (GS) has a rotation period of 13.9 hours. It was named after American astronomer Sherburne Wesley Burnham (1838–1921).

Orbit and classification 

Burnhamia is a non-family asteroid of the main belt's background population when applying the hierarchical clustering method to its proper orbital elements. It orbits the Sun in the outer main-belt at a distance of 2.5–3.8 AU once every 5 years and 8 months (2,076 days; semi-major axis of 3.18 AU). Its orbit has an eccentricity of 0.20 and an inclination of 4° with respect to the ecliptic.

Naming 

This minor planet was named after Sherburne Wesley Burnham (1838–1921), American astronomer who discovered many visual binary stars and is known for his Burnham Double Star Catalogue (BDS), a catalogue of double stars seen in the Northern Hemisphere, which was published in two parts by the Carnegie Institution of Washington in 1906. Burnham observed from the Chicago (1877), Lick (1888) and Yerkes (1897) observatories. The  was published in the journal Astronomische Nachrichten in 1921, and was also mentioned in The Names of the Minor Planets by Paul Herget in 1955. The lunar crater Burnham is also named in his honor.

Physical characteristics 

In the Tholen classification, Burnhamia is closest to a G-type asteroid and somewhat similar to a common stony S-type asteroid, while In ioth the Tholen- and SMASS-like taxonomy of the Small Solar System Objects Spectroscopic Survey (S3OS2), Burnhamia is an X-type asteroid.

Rotation period 

In October 2006, a rotational lightcurve of Burnhamia was obtained from photometric observations by Robert Buchheim at the Altimira Observatory  in California. Lightcurve analysis gave a well-defined rotation period of  hours with a brightness variation of  magnitude. The result supersedes previous observations by French amateur astronomer Laurent Bernasconi from May 2005, with a period of  hours with an amplitude of  magnitude, and from October 2006, that gave a period of  hours and an amplitude of  magnitude.

Diameter and albedo 

The Collaborative Asteroid Lightcurve Link derives an albedo of 0.0602 and a diameter of 66.64 kilometers based on an absolute magnitude of 9.55. These timed observations are taken when the asteroid passes in front of a distant star.

References

External links 
 Lightcurve Database Query (LCDB), at www.minorplanet.info
 Dictionary of Minor Planet Names, Google books
 Asteroids and comets rotation curves, CdR – Geneva Observatory, Raoul Behrend
 Discovery Circumstances: Numbered Minor Planets (1)-(5000) – Minor Planet Center
 
 

000834
Discoveries by Max Wolf
Named minor planets
000834
19160920